The Weatherby Varmintmaster is a lighter quicker-handling version of the Weatherby Mark V. It was first offered for sale in 1963 in two barrel lengths: a 24-inch standard weight and 26-inch heavy weight. The price then was $295, same as the Mark V. Compared with the Mark V it weighs 40% less with most parts being reduced in size by 20%. The trigger assemblies are identical. Weatherby ceased production of its smallest rifle in 1994.

References

External links 
 Weatherby Inc.

Bolt-action rifles of the United States